Isabella, Princess of Asturias may refer to:

 Isabella, Princess of Asturias (1470–1498), Queen of Portugal
 Isabella, Princess of Asturias (1851–1931)
 Isabella I of Castile
 Elisabeth of Bourbon, wife of Philip IV of Spain
 Isabella II of Spain